Frankenstein all'italiana – Prendimi, straziami, che brucio de passion! is an Italian film directed by Armando Crispino.

Plot 
Dr. Victor Frankenstein creates a monster to show his scientific theories, but soon leaves him. So the scientist tries to rebuild his life by getting married with Janet, and retires to his castle with Igor. However, the monster comes back to haunt Frankenstein, and soon Victor finds out that the monster has a ferocious sexual attraction to Janet. Frankenstein then calls Igor to readjust the monster, but Igor also takes advantage of Janet...

Cast 
 Gianrico Tedeschi as Dr. Frankenstein 
 Aldo Maccione  as The Monster 
 Jenny Tamburi as Janet 
 Lorenza Guerrieri as Alice 
 Anna Mazzamauro as Maud 
 Ninetto Davoli as Igor 
 Aldo Valletti
 Alvaro Vitali

Production
Frankenstein all'italiana – Prendimi, straziami, che brucio de passion! is the eighth and final film directed by Armando Crispino. The film entered development under the title Frankenstein diventa nonno.  It was shot in Bomarzo and at R.P.A. Elios Studios in Rome. Crispino later described the film as "a compromise dictated by necessity, if not a mistake. It's the only one of my films that as born from a script in which I did not take part at all...However I think I can say that the movie was not completely shameful, at least in the first part."

Release
Frankenstein all'italiana – Prendimi, straziami, che brucio de passion! was released in Italy where it was distributed by Euro International Film on 23 November 1975. This release was very brief and was immediately withdrawn. It was re-edited and re-released in mid-1976 with the title Prendimi straziami, che brucio di passion!. It was later released to Italian television  as Stringimi forte che burcio di passione.

References

Footnotes

Sources

External links

1975 films
Italian comedy horror films
1970s comedy horror films
Films directed by Armando Crispino
Films scored by Stelvio Cipriani
Frankenstein films
Italian parody films
Parodies of horror
1975 comedy films
1970s Italian films